is a Japanese feminine given name.

People
 , a Japanese voice actress

Fictional characters
 , a character in the Japanese light novel, manga and anime series Nogizaka Haruka no Himitsu.
 , a character in the Japanese video game Tales of Symphonia
 , a character in the Japanese manga series Shadow Star
 , a character in the Japanese light novel, manga and anime series A Certain Magical Index
 , a character in the visual novel Katawa Shoujo
 , a character in the Japanese manga series Magic of Stella 
 , a schoolgirl character in the Japanese shōnen manga series Akumetsu
 , a character in the Japanese light novel, manga and anime series Sakurasou no Pet na Kanojo.

Japanese feminine given names